
The Heffron ministry (1962–1964) or Second Heffron ministry was the 60th ministry of the New South Wales Government, and was led by the 30th Premier, Bob Heffron, of the Labor Party. The ministry was the second of two consecutive occasions when the Government was led by Heffron, as Premier.

Heffron was first elected to the New South Wales Legislative Assembly in 1930 and served continuously until 1968, representing the seats of Botany and Maroubra. Having served continuously as Minister for Emergency Services in the first McKell ministry, and Minister for Education in the second McKell ministry, and in the first, second, and third ministries of Jim McGirr, and then the first, second, third and fourth ministries of Joseph Cahill. Heffron served as Deputy Premier to Cahill between 1953 and 1959 until Cahill died in office on 22 October 1959. The following day, Heffron was elected as Labor Leader and became Premier. Heffron led Labor to victory at the 1962 state election, where Labor's primary vote decreased by 0.55% however it picked up an additional 5 seats. Historian David Clune attributed Heffron's easy victory to a backlash against the economic policies of the Menzies federal government rather than a vote of confidence in Heffron's Labor.

This ministry covers the period from 14 March 1962 until 30 April 1964, when Heffron, aged 73, resigned as Premier and retired to the backbench, his successor as Premier being his deputy, Jack Renshaw.

Composition of ministry

The composition of the ministry was announced by Premier Heffron following the 1962 state election on 14 March 1962, and covers the period until 30 April 1964, when Heffron resigned as Premier.

 
Ministers are members of the Legislative Assembly unless otherwise noted.

See also

Notes

References

 

! colspan="3" style="border-top: 5px solid #cccccc" | New South Wales government ministries

New South Wales ministries
1962 establishments in Australia
1964 disestablishments in Australia
Australian Labor Party ministries in New South Wales